3,5-Xylidine is the organic compound with the formula C6H3(CH3)2NH2. It is one of several isomeric xylidines.  It is a colorless viscous liquid.  It is used in the production of the dye Pigment Red 149.

Production
3,5-Xylidine is produced industrially by amination of the xylenol using ammonia and alumina catalyst.

References

Anilines